Hassan Waleed (Arabic:حسن وليد) (born 6 November 1997) is a Qatari footballer. He currently plays for Lusail.

External links

References

Qatari footballers
1997 births
Living people
Al-Gharafa SC players
Lusail SC players
Qatar Stars League players
Qatari Second Division players
Association football defenders